The 2016 Tennessee Volunteers football team represented the University of Tennessee in the 2016 NCAA Division I FBS football season. This was the program's 120th overall season, 83rd as a member of the Southeastern Conference (SEC), and 25th within the SEC Eastern Division. The Volunteers played their home games at Neyland Stadium in Knoxville, Tennessee and were led by fourth-year head coach Butch Jones. They finished the season 9–4, 4–4 in SEC play to finish in a three-way tie for second place in the Eastern Division. They were invited to the Music City Bowl where they defeated Nebraska.

Previous season
The 2015 Tennessee Volunteers football team started off their season with a 59–30 victory over the Bowling Green Falcons. They then took on the 19th-ranked Oklahoma Sooners at Neyland Stadium where they gave up 17 unanswered points and lost in double overtime 31–24. Following a 55–10 win over Western Carolina, Tennessee traveled down to Gainesville, Florida, blew a 13-point lead in the second half, failed to convert a walk-off field goal and lost to the Florida Gators 28–27 for the 11th consecutive season. The following week back home, the Vols fell to the Arkansas Razorbacks 24–20. Despite trailing by 21 points to #19 Georgia in the 2nd quarter, Tennessee rallied back to go ahead of the Bulldogs in the 3rd quarter, score the winning touchdown with less than six minutes in the game and prevented Georgia from reaching the end zone to score their first victory over their SEC East opponent since 2009. After a bye week, Tennessee traveled to Tuscaloosa, Alabama to take on bitter rivals Alabama. In a low scoring defensive battle, the eighth ranked Crimson Tide scored the winning touchdown drive with just over two minutes remaining in the contest and Tennessee fell 19–14. Evan Berry tied a school record for most kickoff return touchdowns in a single season in the Volunteers 52–21 beatdown of the Kentucky Wildcats. After allowing 21 unanswered points in the 3rd quarter against the South Carolina Gamecocks, Tennessee kicked a go-ahead field goal with ten minutes remaining in the contest. With less than a minute left in play, the Gamecocks had driven the ball to Tennessee's 13-yard line when Malik Foreman forced a fumble. It was recovered by Jalen Reeves-Maybin and Tennessee won the game 27–24. Despite a sluggish offensive performance, Tennessee's defense held North Texas to just 199 total yards in a 24–0 victory over the Mean Green and became bowl eligible, it was also their first time shutting out an FCS opponent since 2011. The following week, Tennessee beat eastern division opponent Missouri for the first time in a 19–8 victory in Missouri coach Gary Pinkel's final home game. Tennessee finished the regular season 8–4 with a 53–28 thrashing of in-state rival Vanderbilt. The Vols were invited to play in the 2016 Outback Bowl in Tampa, Florida against the Northwestern Wildcats of the Big Ten. Tennessee defeated the Wildcats 45–6, finishing their 2015 season at 9–4.

Offseason

Departures
Departures of scholarship players from the 2015 team.

Winter months
During the early part of the offseason, a number of players and coaches left the program. Freshman quarterback Sherion Jones announced he was transferring from Tennessee to Colorado on January 7. He returned to Tennessee on January 27. John Jancek, a member of Butch Jones's coaching staff since his time with Central Michigan and Cincinnati, was relieved of his duties as defensive coordinator on January 6. Jones said that he and Jancek "had a long discussion this morning and we both came to the conclusion that it was best to part ways. I want to thank Coach Jancek for his contributions to the University of Tennessee football program the past three years. His hard work and dedication to this program played a major role in our back-to-back bowl wins. These decisions are never easy especially for someone I have worked with at three different schools." Penn State defensive coordinator Bob Shoop was hired for the same position at Tennessee on January 9. Larry Scott, who served as the interim head coach for the final six games of the Miami Hurricanes's 2015 season, was hired to be Tennessee's new tight ends coach on January 4.

Summer months

SEC Media Days
During Tennessee's turn at SEC Media Days in Hoover, Alabama, Coach Jones and the three attending players made it clear that they were there with the mindset of "business as usual" and not to create news or hype despite being the favorites to win the SEC East. Cameron Sutton responded to questions about Tennessee's game against Florida with how the team's season will "open up with Appalachian State, who was an 11-win team last year. We don't consider ourselves worried about games long down the road. It's one week at a time, one game at a time. That's our mindset right now. We're focused on Appalachian State." Hobbs responded to the hype around Tennessee as being "outside. Noise, really. You can't really control hype. You can't really control what other people say. What you can control is how you approach each day, how you focus on the details, how are you getting better as a player and how is the team getting better every single day you step on the field? We're focused on that — what we can control because we can't really do anything (about) what we can't control." Jones responded to questions about Tennessee blowing late leads against Oklahoma, Florida, Arkansas and Alabama by pointing out in "the last 18 games, we're 13-5. And the amazing thing, when you look at it of being 13-5 over the last 18 games, is those five losses have come by a combined total of 25 points. So what are we doing to take the next step as a football program? We talk about learning how to finish games, learning how to close games out. We talked about clutch plays, making critical plays at critical moments of the game."

On the final day of SEC Media Days, Tennessee received 225 of 331 first-place votes and were selected by the media as the favorite to win the SEC Eastern Division for the first time since 2005. However, the Vols were picked to lose to Alabama in the SEC Championship Game receiving 29 votes to the Crimson Tide's 223. "You want those expectations," Coach Jones said. "I think it's a compliment to everyone in our program of how far we've come. It's not where you start, it's where you finish. But I think it is a compliment in how we've grown and developed this football program."

Preseason camp
The Volunteers opened up preseason camp on August 1, 31 days prior to their kickoff against the Appalachian State Mountaineers. Among the biggest questions going into preseason camp for the Vols included the development of senior quarterback Joshua Dobbs, who would start at left tackle, maintaining overall health, how new defensive coordinator Bob Shoop would work with a stacked defensive corp and if Tennessee can live up to the expectations surrounding the team.

After the first week of camp, the biggest issue facing the team – according to Coach Jones – was the consistency in the passing game. This was compounded by a young wide receiver group that showed speed, but had many dropped balls. Another issue was that no starters for either left or right tackle had been announced. Coach Jones said he's been pleased with the competition and talent level of those fighting for the positions, but that the roles are anyone's for the taking. Jalen Hurd, who's short of the school rushing record, said he's targeting Travis Henry's career rushing record of 3,078 yards. He believes "it's reachable and, you know, you can see it, I definitely want to do it. That's a goal of mine. But obviously the biggest goal for me is just to help get my team a national championship."

Personnel

Roster & staff

2016 recruiting class

Returning starters
Nine players return on offense, eight on defense and two out of four on special teams specific positions.

Offense

Defense

Special teams

Current depth chart

Schedule
Tennessee announced their 2016 football schedule on October 29, 2015. The 2016 schedule consists of 7 home games, 4 away games and 1 neutral site game in the regular season. The Vols will host SEC foes Alabama, Florida, Kentucky, and Missouri, and will travel to Georgia, South Carolina, Texas A&M, and Vanderbilt.

Tennessee opened the season at home for the third time in the last four seasons, when it played host to Appalachian State on September 3 in the first meeting between the two schools. The Volunteers then faced Virginia Tech in the "Battle at Bristol" at Bristol, Tennessee, on September 10 in front of the largest crowd in football history, over 156,000 fans at Bristol Motor Speedway.

Tennessee returns to Neyland Stadium for two home games, Ohio on September 17 and the Florida Gators on September 24. The Volunteers have faced the Gators to start the conference schedule 13 of the last 14 years. The first of two road games occurs at Georgia on October 1. Tennessee holds a 22–21–2 edge in the rivals' series, but is also seeking its first victory in Athens since 2006. On October 8, the Volunteers make their first-ever trip to College Station, Texas, to face Texas A&M. It will also be the first regular-season meeting between the schools. Tennessee is 2–0 all-time against the Aggies in post-season play. The Volunteers will also return to tradition this year with their annual November rivalry game against Kentucky on November 12, after last being played in October 2015.

Schedule Source:

‡ – Current NCAA record for largest attendance to a collegiate football game.

Rankings

Game summaries

Appalachian State

Pregame line: Tennessee –21

Sources:

The ninth–ranked Tennessee Volunteers overcame a 10–point halftime deficit to escape with a 20–13 victory over the Appalachian State Mountaineers. In overtime, Tennessee faced third-and-goal from the 2, when Joshua Dobbs ran then lost control of the ball as he was hit while extending his arms across the goal line. Jalen Hurd recovered the fumble in the end zone, and Aaron Medley kicked the extra point. In the Mountaineers' ensuing drive, Tennessee's Micah Abernathy ended the game by breaking up an end-zone pass on fourth–and–5 from the 20. Tennessee head coach Butch Jones commented after the game: "The first game of the year is always a game of the unknowns. We're still developing our identity for this football team, but we found a way to win, and at the end of the day, that's what it's about, but we have to get a lot better. Credit App State too. They're a really good football team."

Virginia Tech

Pregame line: Tennessee –11

Sources:

Before an NCAA-record attendance of 156,990 in the "Battle at Bristol" against the Virginia Tech Hokies, the seventeenth-ranked Volunteers overcame a 14-point first-quarter deficit to score 24 points in the second quarter to win 45–24. Quarterback Joshua Dobbs threw three touchdown passes and had two rushing scores. Volunteers defensive back Micah Abernathy also set a school single-game record with three fumble recoveries. The Hokies ultimately lost five fumbles, three of which resulted in Tennessee touchdowns. Abernathy's performance earned him SEC Defensive Player of the Week honors.

Following the game, Tennessee head coach Butch Jones called the venue "a spectacle ... I don't think this will be duplicated or replicated." About the game, Jones stated "We didn't start out like we wanted to obviously, down 14-0, but I really liked the way we responded ... We were finally able to run the football and play Tennessee style of football." The Volunteers extend their eight-game winning streak, the longest since their 14 in a row in the 1998 and 1999 seasons, and the third longest active winning streak in the nation.

Ohio

Pregame line: Tennessee –27

Sources:

Plagued with injuries prior to and during the game against the Ohio Bobcats, the fifteenth-ranked Volunteers struggled in the afternoon heat but maintained their early lead, winning 28–19. Tennessee scored 38 seconds into the game on a 20–yard pass from Joshua Dobbs to Josh Malone. Ohio, a 27–point underdog, remained relatively close throughout the game, until Dobbs and Malone connected again for a 20–yard touchdown, and the game's last scoring drive, with 11:07 remaining in the fourth quarter. Tennessee head coach Butch Jones called it "another gritty win" and spoke on starting conference play next week, "Our goal was to be 3–0 at this point, and we are 3–0, but I think everyone will tell you that we have to get a lot better."

No. 19 Florida

Pregame line: Tennessee –9

Sources:

The 14th-ranked Volunteers trailed their rivals, the 19th-ranked Florida Gators, 21–3 at halftime. Tennessee mounted a comeback in the second half, scoring 35 unanswered points and snapping an 11-game losing streak, to win 38–28. Quarterback Joshua Dobbs threw four touchdowns, ran for another, and amassed a career-high 319 passing yards. On the defensive side, Derek Barnett had five tackles (three solo), two sacks for six yards, three tackles for loss for eight yards and one pass breakup. For their performances, Dobbs and Barnett were awarded SEC Players of the Week, with Dobbs as Offensive POW and Barnett as Co-Defensive Lineman POW.

The win gave the Volunteers their 12th double-digit winning streak (10) in program history. The win streak is also the longest of head coach Butch Jones' career. Following the game, Jones spoke on the resiliency of his team, "Must win, all that - that is not the case. We are building something special here with character and competitiveness. It's just one game. We've got to go on the road next week. The resolve of these kids, with all the expectations on this football game and you go down at half time and to have that second half performance. If you don't have character in your football program, that does not happen."

No. 25 Georgia

Pregame line: Tennessee –4

Sources:

The 11th-ranked Tennessee Volunteers rallied from a double-digit deficit, the fourth time in five games, to defeat the 25th-ranked Georgia Bulldogs, 34–31. Georgia led 17-0 in the first half but only had a 24-21 edge when starting deep in its own territory late in the fourth quarter. Georgia quarterback Jacob Eason risked a pass from his own end zone but fumbled the ball after being hit by two defenders, Derek Barnett and Cortez McDowell. Tennessee's Corey Vereen fell on it for a touchdown. Eason seemed to redeem himself within the closing seconds of the game, by driving his offense past midfield. He then found Riley Ridley, streaking down the left sideline, and delivered a 47-yard pass that Ridley took in for the score. However, in the short ensuing kickoff, Tennessee's Evan Berry's 20-yard return put his team at midfield. With four seconds left in the game, quarterback Joshua Dobbs threw a 43-yard Hail Mary pass and connected with Jauan Jennings, who was just inside the end zone and in front of most of his Georgia defenders, for the win.

Barnett's forced fumble, five tackles, two sacks, and 2.5 tackles for loss earned him SEC Defensive Player of the Week honors. Long snapper Riley Lovingood was named SEC Co-Special Teams POW. In the 4th quarter, he snapped the ball to punter Trevor Daniel, who booted the high ball to the UGA 6-yard line. Lovingood raced down the field to make the catch, downing the ball to set the field position for Barnett's strip sack of Eason and Vereen's fumble recovery in the end zone two plays later.

Following the game, coach Butch Jones spoke on what he told his team before that last play, "I told our kids in the huddle that we were going to come down with it—we're going to find a way. And Josh (Dobbs) threw the best ball he's thrown in his career. And what can I say about Jauan Jennings? He wasn't going to be denied." Jones added, "Again, just resiliency ... 11 straight wins ... fifth-longest streak in school history. But really the most important thing is it gets us one step closer. We needed to be 1-0 and we were 1-0. This puts us at 5-0 overall. We're just finding ways to win football games."

No. 8 Texas A&M

Pregame line: Texas A&M –6

Sources:

In only the third meeting between the two teams, the ninth-ranked Tennessee Volunteers visited the eighth-ranked Texas A&M Aggies at College Station, Texas. The game was the first for the teams as SEC opponents since the Aggies joined the conference in 2012. After falling behind through three quarters by a score of 28–14, Tennessee scored three touchdowns in the final seven minutes of the fourth quarter and rallied to force overtime. However, seven turnovers in the game led to the Volunteers' first loss of the season as Texas A&M won, 45-38, in double overtime.

Tennessee head coach Butch Jones spoke on his team's gameplay, "I'm very, very proud of our kids. Just the fight in them, the will to win. But again, you can't have seven turnovers, you can't turn the football over, you can't have the penalties we had. You have almost 700 yards of offense and you can't turn the football over. It's the details. Especially when you go on the road, the small details add up to the big details." Jones continued, speaking on the team's emotions and their next opponent, "That's life in the Southeastern Conference. It's not for everyone. The toughness that's involved day-to-day, week-to-week — the grind — and we have to get better in a hurry because we've got the No. 1 ranked team in the country coming in. So we have to improve on our deficiencies from this week."

No. 1 Alabama

Pregame line: Alabama  –12

Sources: 

The ninth-ranked Tennessee Volunteers and the top-ranked Alabama Crimson Tide met for the 99th time to renew their rivalry on the "Third Saturday in October" for the first time in four seasons. Alabama won their 10th–straight game in the series, 49–10, the worst loss for the Volunteers since losing 59–14 at Oregon in 2013. Tennessee pulled within seven in the second quarter, after forcing a fumble on the Crimson Tide's 11-yard line. Two plays later, Alvin Kamara rushed up the middle to bring the score to 14-7. However, the Volunteers' only other score in the game came in the third quarter when kicker Aaron Medley chipped in a 37-yard field goal to make the score 28-10 at the 4:03 mark.

Following the game, Tennessee head coach Butch Jones spoke on the loss. "It's a line of scrimmage game," he said. "When you give up 438 yards rushing and offensively have 32 yards rushing, you're not even giving yourself an opportunity to be in the game. We had way too many negative yardage football plays. Again, third down conversions [only 3 of 16], getting off the field, big explosive plays." Jones added about now entering a bye week, "I think the bye week is coming at the appropriate time. We have a lot of goals to get better as a football team. Everyone has to be responsible for their own self-determination and accountability to get better during this bye week. A lot of this [week] will be spent in the training room and getting healthy." Seven Volunteers could not play due to injuries, while three others were injured during gameplay.

South Carolina

Pregame line: Tennessee –13

Sources: 

Entering the 35th meeting between the two teams, the 18th-ranked Volunteers traveled to Columbia, South Carolina, to face the Gamecocks. South Carolina snapped a three-game losing streak and got their first victory over Tennessee in four years, winning 24–21. All four contests, during Coach Butch Jones' tenure, have been decided by three points or less.

The Volunteers committed three costly penalties in the first five minutes, which allowed the Gamecocks to score first. Within the last two minutes of the first quarter, Tennessee tied the game but was never again close in scoring, until Evan Berry returned a late third-quarter kickoff for 100 yards to put the Volunteers within three points at 17–14. Berry's touchdown tied Willie Gault's special-teams school career record of four. The teams swapped touchdowns in the fourth quarter, with South Carolina still leading by three. A last-minute drive advanced the Volunteers to the Carolina 40-yard line, but Aaron Medley's potentially game-tying 58-yard field goal fell short as time expired.

Coach Jones called his team's gameplay "unacceptable", adding "You go on the road, you can't turn the football over. There was a lack of explosive plays, missed tackles, too many penalties on special teams when you do a good job of getting the ball out on some returns. Those are momentum-killers ... We can't let this one loss define who we are. We've got to come back. But obviously, too sloppy. I'm just very, very disappointed in the way we played, particularly coming off a bye week. Give South Carolina credit, but that was unacceptable."

Tennessee Tech

Pregame line: Tennessee –41

Sources:

Tennessee hosted Tennessee Tech for its 100th homecoming game. The Volunteers snapped a three-game losing streak in a 55-0 blowout of the Golden Eagles. Tennessee also ended a season-long pattern of slow starts by producing six touchdowns and one field goal on its first eight possessions. The Volunteers had been outscored 83-24 in the opening quarter of their first eight games, but they led Tech, 21-0, after the first period and a 73-yard run by John Kelly, replacing Jalen Hurd due to his departure from the team earlier in the week. Kelly's run was Tennessee's longest offensive play this season and its longest run from scrimmage since 2006. With the win, Tennessee became bowl eligible for the third consecutive season.

Tennessee head coach Butch Jones called the victory a "complete team win." He added, "I loved their focus and I loved their mindset. I thought this was our best week of preparation. We practiced with energy, and talked all week long about returning to the standards and expectation with passion and energy and the inspiration that it takes to play this game, so I was really proud of them."

Kentucky

Pregame line: Tennessee –15

Sources:

The Tennessee Volunteers and the Kentucky Wildcats met for the 112th time in their rivalry. The Volunteers have played the Wildcats more than any other team in program history and improved to 79-24-9 all-time in the series with a 49–36 victory. Tennessee has now won five straight against Kentucky and 31 of the last 32 meetings.

Quarterback Joshua Dobbs amassed 370 yards and five total touchdowns (three passing, two rushing). Dobbs, returning running back Alvin Kamara, and John Kelly combined for 369 of the team's 376 total rushing yards. The two teams totaled 1,204 yards, including 789 in rushing, the most combined rushing yards in a Tennessee game this season. The Volunteers finished with 599 total yards while Kentucky gained 635. The game also saw the return of cornerback Cameron Sutton, injured in the September 10 game, with three tackles and two passes broken up.

Head coach Butch Jones called the win a "hard fought, very very good team victory." Regarding the offense, he said, "I believe we only had five third downs the entire game, which means you're winning first downs, mixed downs, first and second down. I thought our offensive line came off the ball really well." Speaking of the defense, he said, "[there's] obviously a lot of stuff to correct and improve upon, but the one thing I thought was glaring in this game was our red zone efficiency defensively. I believe we only gave up two touchdowns in six trips ... I'm just proud of our players with the resolve and the resiliency."

Missouri

Pregame line: Tennessee –17.5

Sources:

In the final home game of the season, senior quarterback Joshua Dobbs accounted for five touchdowns to lead the Tennessee Volunteers to a 63-37 victory over the Missouri Tigers. Dobbs passed for 223 yards, threw three touchdowns, and rushed for two more scores — including a career-long 70-yard breakaway run — to finish with a career-best 413 total yards. Total offense for Tennessee was 609 yards, 223 passing and 386 rushing. The game was relatively close until the fourth quarter, when the Volunteers outscored the Tigers 28-10. It marked the most points Tennessee had scored in a quarter this season and the first time in breaching 60 points in a game since 2009. Just as the game began in Knoxville all eyes were focused on Baton Rouge, LA, where the Florida Gators clinched the SEC East and a trip to the SEC championship game with a win over LSU, thus ending any possibility of a tie-breaker.

Head coach Butch Jones knew the game wasn't "going to be pretty", but he thought his team "really rallied". He added, "We knew it was going to be this type of game. Missouri has a very explosive offense ... It was a very fitting last game in Neyland Stadium. I'm proud of how far we've come with our football program, in the last 17 games, we're 14-3, second in the Southeastern Conference. Over the last three games, I believe we've scored over 40 points per game, and that hasn't been done since 1995 — so, a lot of good things happening. I'm proud of our seniors, and I'm proud of our football team to gut through this win and find a way to win a football game."

Vanderbilt

Pregame line: Tennessee –8

Sources:

No. 24 Nebraska

Pregame line: Tennessee –9.5

Sources:

Team players drafted into the NFL

Reference:

References

Tennessee
Tennessee Volunteers football seasons
Music City Bowl champion seasons
Tennessee Volunteers football